The Future is the sole solo studio album by Rodney P released on Low Life Records in 2004.

Track listing
 "Intro"
 "The Nice Up"
 "Da Hot Style"
 "The Future"
 "Big Tings Again" (featuring M.C.D)
 "Fading"
 "I Don't Care (Time to Party)" (featuring Mystro)
 "Doggist"
 "Trouble" (featuring Honey Williams)
 "Vibes"
 "No Pets Allowed" (featuring Karizma)
 "Temper Temper"
 "We Don't Like Coppers"
 "I Believe" (featuring Olivia Chaney)
 "Riddim Killa"

 Track 15 is a CD-only bonus track and does not appear on the vinyl version.

Singles

External links
http://www.lowliferecords.co.uk/Release.asp?ID=17
https://web.archive.org/web/20070829064125/http://www.ukhh.com/bhh/artists/rodney_p-the_future.htm

2004 debut albums
Rodney P albums